Aggustiana is a genus of moths of the family Noctuidae.

Species
Aggustiana fragilalis  Schaus, 1916
Aggustiana guards  (Schaus, 1904)
Aggustiana intermedia  (Druce, 1898)
Aggustiana libitina  (Druce, 1890)
Aggustiana limaea  (Druce, 1890)
Aggustiana mox  (Dyar, 1914)
Aggustiana nigripalpis  (Druce, 1898)
Aggustiana undilinea  (Schaus, 1913)

References
Natural History Museum Lepidoptera genus database

Calpinae
Noctuoidea genera